Şatlyk is a city in Sakarçäge District, Mary Region, Turkmenistan.

Etymology
Prior to 1971 the settlement was known as Şehitli. The word şehit in Turkmen means "martyr" or "someone who dies an untimely death", but the reference is obscure. The word şatlyk, on the other hand, means "joy, happiness".

Economy
Şatlyk's main industry is natural gas extraction from the Shatlyk Gas Field.  The Shatlyk compressor station is nearby. A large poultry farm is located east of the city.

Transportation
Şatlyk lies on the P-9 highway, which connects to the outskirts of the city of Mary to the east and intersects with the M37 highway at the town of Deňizhan to the southwest. It is near the Mary-Turkmenabat rail line of the Trans-Caspian Railway and is served by Garybata rail station. Near Şatlyk, at the Şatlyk compressor station, is the start of the East–West pipeline for transport of natural gas.

References 

Populated places in Mary Region